Nazbol or Nazbols may refer to:

 National Bolshevism, a political movement that combines elements of radical nationalism and Bolshevism
 National Bolshevik Party, from 1993 to 2007 a Russian political party with a program of National Bolshevism